Imagination Playground at Burling Slip is a playground on John Street near the South Street Seaport in New York City along South Street. The playground was designed by David Rockwell of Rockwell Group. It opened to the public on July 28, 2010.

References

External links

Parks in Manhattan
Financial District, Manhattan
2010 establishments in New York City